Brownlow Cecil may refer to:

 Brownlow Cecil, 8th Earl of Exeter (1701–1754)
 Brownlow Cecil, 9th Earl of Exeter (1725–1793) 
 Brownlow Cecil, 2nd Marquess of Exeter (1795–1867) 
 Brownlow Cecil, 4th Marquess of Exeter (1849–1898)